The Gallatin National Forest (now known as the Custer-Gallatin National Forest) is a United States National Forest located in South-West Montana. Most of the Custer-Gallatin goes along the state's southern border, with some of it a part of North-West Wyoming.

Geography 
Most of the Gallatin borders Yellowstone National Park and is a part of the Greater Yellowstone Ecosystem, an area which encompasses almost  in and around the park. The Custer National Forest is spread out along Eastern Montana and the North-West side of Wyoming, with most of its land being held in Montana. The forest stretches through about six counties, including Park, Gallatin, Sweet Grass, Madison, Carbon, and Meagher.

There are six separate mountain ranges within the forest including the Gallatin, Madison, Bridger, Crazy, Absaroka, and Beartooth Ranges. The forest includes two wilderness areas, the Absaroka–Beartooth and the Lee Metcalf, along with some of the tributaries for the Yellowstone, Madison, and Missouri rivers.

Wilderness Areas 

 Absaroka–Beartooth Wilderness
 Lee Metcalf Wilderness.

Wildlife and vegetation 
While the lower elevations are often covered in grasses and sagebrush, higher altitudes support Douglas fir, with several species of spruce, cottonwood and aspen being the dominant tree species. Major tributaries of the Missouri River, the Gallatin and Madison Rivers, also are found in the forest. The habitat supports over 300 wildlife species, including the grizzly bear, bald eagle, and peregrine falcon. Many western North American species are represented in this climax ecosystem including elk, mule deer, bison, moose, bighorn sheep, pronghorn, cougar, gray wolf and black bear.

Fish within the numerous rivers and other bodies of water include white sucker, longnose sucker, mountain sucker, longnose dace, western mosquitofish, mottled sculpin, and gamefish such as Yellowstone cutthroat trout, mountain whitefish, and the introduced rainbow trout, brown trout, and brook trout. Various subspecies of trout are plentiful in the streams and they contribute to the forest being one of the preeminent fly fishing regions in the United States. The population of Yellowstone cutthroat trout in and near Gallatin National Forest have been at risk of hybridization with rainbow trout.

History 
The forest was founded in 1899 as a part of the Northern U.S. Forest Service, eventually being named after Albert Gallatin (1761–1849), a U.S. Secretary of the Treasury and scholar of Native American languages and cultures.

In 1959, a 7.2-magnitude earthquake occurred in Madison Canyon outside of Yellowstone National Park, resulting in a massive landslide that blocked the Madison River and formed what we know as Quake Lake.

As of 2014, the Gallatin National Forest and Custer National Forest were merged administratively in order to combat rising costs, with a new management plan created for both national forests in 2020.

Management 
Since 2014, the Gallatin and Custer National Forests are managed together as the Custer–Gallatin National Forest with a headquarters in Bozeman, Montana and an additional office in Billings. There are seven local ranger district offices for the forest, with locations in West Yellowstone, Livingston, Bozeman, Gardiner, Ashland, and Red Lodge for Montana and Camp Crook for South Dakota.

Access 

There's access to the forest off Interstate 90 South on U.S. Highway 89 from Livingston, Montana, to Gardiner, Montana, or South on U.S. 191 from Bozeman, Montana, to West Yellowstone.

Over  of hiking trails are located in the forest providing access to wilderness areas and interlinking with trails in Yellowstone National Park. There are almost 40 vehicle accessible campgrounds scattered throughout the forest, numerous picnic areas, and even cabins that can be rented for a nominal fee through the forest's district offices. West Yellowstone, Montana provides access both into the forest and to Yellowstone National Park and is a popular snowmobile center during the winter. Nighttime temperatures can be below freezing any time of the year, and mosquitoes in the late spring and early summer are abundant. Summertime high temperatures average in the 70s Fahrenheit (21–26 °C), and the wintertime lows can drop below −40 degrees. Most of the precipitation falls in the form of snow with some places averaging over  annually.

See also
 List of U.S. National Forests
 List of forests in Montana

References

External links

 Custer-Gallatin National Forest - official site
 Gallatin County Emergency Management
 Gallatin National Forest Ranger Log Books, 1906-1930. Held at Montana State University Archives and Special Collections

 
National Forests of Montana
National Forests of the Rocky Mountains
Greater Yellowstone Ecosystem
Protected areas established in 1899
Protected areas of Gallatin County, Montana
Protected areas of Park County, Montana
Protected areas of Sweet Grass County, Montana
Protected areas of Madison County, Montana
Protected areas of Carbon County, Montana
Protected areas of Meagher County, Montana
1899 establishments in Montana